Phillip John-William Cocu (born 29 October 1970) is a Dutch professional football manager and former player, he is the manager of Vitesse.

Cocu was born in Eindhoven but raised in Zevenaar, playing youth football for local clubs DCS and De Graafschap. After a year at AFC '34, he started his professional career at AZ. In 1990, Cocu moved to Vitesse. A broken fibula disrupted his first season, but he became a first-team regular in the following four seasons. In 1995, he joined PSV, where he won the KNVB Cup and the Eredivisie title in 1997. Cocu played for Barcelona between 1998 and 2004. There, he would become club captain, win La Liga in 1999 and play two Champions League semi-finals. He left the club in 2004 as club record holder for the most league appearances by a foreign player. During Cocu's second stint at PSV, he won another three Eredivisie titles and reached the Champions League semi-finals. After a year at Al Jazira, Cocu retired from professional football.

Cocu debuted for the Netherlands national team in 1996 and appeared at the 1998 World Cup, scoring two goals but missing a penalty in the semi-finals against Brazil. He also played at the 2006 World Cup, as well as the 1996, 2000 and 2004 European Championships. Cocu reached the semi-finals in the latter two tournaments and in 2004, he served as captain of the Dutch team. With 101 caps, Cocu is eighth on the list of most Dutch international appearances. During his career, he mainly played as a defensive "playmaker" in midfield, but became equally known for his ability to be fielded as a defender, wing back, winger or forward.

After his retirement from playing professional football, Cocu joined PSV again as youth coach and later assistant manager. He also served as assistant at the Dutch team under Bert van Marwijk between 2008 and 2012. Cocu was caretaker manager at PSV in 2012, during which he won the KNVB Cup. In 2013, he was officially appointed as PSV manager, and won three league titles in his five years at the club.

Early career 
Cocu was born in Eindhoven, but he and his family moved to Zevenaar when he was three years old after his father switched jobs. He started playing youth football at the local amateur club DCS when he was six. Even though youth players normally were not allowed to play until they were seven, the team made an exception for Cocu. He played for DCS until he was picked up by De Graafschap's youth academy. After a short period, he moved to AFC '34 in 1986. A year later, his talent was again noticed by a professional club and in June 1987, Cocu joined the AZ youth ranks.

Club career

Early years 
Cocu began in the AZ reserve squad but was soon added to the first team. He made his professional debut on 22 January 1989, when assistant coach Hugo Hovenkamp (replacing the bedridden manager Hans Eijkenbroek) brought him on in an Eerste Divisie match against NEC. The 18-year-old played as left winger at the time. Cocu scored his first goal two weeks later in a cup match against Fortuna Sittard, followed up by his first league goal in March against SVV. He would go on and score four goals in his first season. In the 1989-90 season, he appeared in nearly every league match. After the competition ended, Cocu was sold to the newly promoted Vitesse for €272,000.

Cocu played only eight matches in his first Vitesse season after he suffered a broken fibula. He had a more productive second season, playing most matches and scoring three times. He netted his first Vitesse goal in August 1991 in a match against ADO Den Haag. In Arnhem, Cocu changed from being a left winger to a central midfielder. Coach Herbert Neumann envisioned a leading central role for Cocu in 1991 and placed him on the midfield position. In 1992, Cocu played his first European match when Vitesse faced Derry City. After Vitesse defeated Derry City, they beat Belgian side Mechelen in the following round. The away match was decided by a long-range effort from Cocu (0–1). Vitesse was eventually knocked out by Real Madrid. In the Eredivisie, the team finished in fourth place. Cocu also played all league matches and doubled his goal tally in his third season. In the 1993–94 season, Cocu scored 11 Eredivisie goals, including three in a 5–0 victory over Go Ahead Eagles in December. After the season, Louis van Gaal and Ajax became interested in buying Cocu, but they could not meet the transfer fee demands. A year later, PSV and Feyenoord triggered the release clause in Cocu's contract, making Vitesse unable to reject the offer. He eventually chose to play for PSV.

Cocu was signed in June 1995 in a joint-transfer with Chris van der Weerden. He immediately scored in his PSV debut against Fortuna Sittard (1–3). In his first season, he won the KNVB Cup with PSV. In the final against Sparta Rotterdam (5–2), Cocu scored the first goal. In October 1996, Cocu scored twice in a 7–2 win against Feyenoord. That season, Cocu and PSV would go on to win the Johan Cruyff Shield, beating Ajax 3–0, and the Eredivisie. In the 1997–98 season, Cocu won the Johan Cruyff Shield again after scoring twice in a 3–1 victory against Roda JC. In the Eredivisie, PSV finished second behind Ajax. The KNVB Cup final was also lost to Ajax (5–0). After the season, Cocu decided not to extend his contract, demonstrating his intent to leave on a free transfer. Atlético Madrid, Real Madrid, Juventus, Internazionale and Lazio were all keen on signing Cocu, but he ultimately chose to join Barcelona, the club he supported as a child.

Barcelona
In Barcelona, Cocu found himself with fellow Dutchmen Louis van Gaal, Michael Reiziger, Frank de Boer, Patrick Kluivert, Boudewijn Zenden, Ronald de Boer and Winston Bogarde. Forming a midfield with Luís Figo and Pep Guardiola, Cocu played 36 league matches and scored 12 goals, thereby contributing to Barcelona's La Liga title win. In March, Cocu decided the match against Real Sociedad by scoring both goals (2–0). In his second season, the team finished second in the league behind Deportivo de La Coruña. Cocu scored six league goals, including two against Real Oviedo (a 3–2 win) and two against Athletic Bilbao (a 0–4 win). Barcelona and Cocu reached the Champions League semi-finals, where they were knocked-out by Valencia. Cocu scored the final goal in the return leg. In 2000, Van Gaal left and was succeeded by Lorenzo Serra Ferrer and Carles Rexach. But in the following two seasons, the team performances declined even more, with Barcelona twice ending fourth in the league.

In 2001, Pep Guardiola left Barcelona, making space for a new midfield consisting of Cocu, Xavi and Gabri. In the 2001–02 season, Barcelona reached the Champions League semi-finals again, but were denied the final by Real Madrid. In 2002, the returning coach Louis van Gaal chose Cocu as vice-captain behind Luis Enrique. The 2002–03 season was Barcelona's worst in years, however: the team finished sixth in La Liga, Van Gaal was fired early on and Cocu tore his knee ligament in a Champions League match against Internazionale (0–0) in February. He was sidelined for two months. Weeks earlier, Barcelona had already beat Inter 3–0, with a goal by Cocu. With his contract expiring in 2003, he waited until after the FC Barcelona presidential elections to make a decision on extension. Cocu, who intended to join PSV if the negotiations failed, eventually agreed on a one-year extension in June.

The 2003–04 season began with new coach Frank Rijkaard. Cocu scored Barcelona's first goal of the league season, deciding the match against Athletic Bilbao (0–1). He played 36 league matches in total and also frequently served as the team captain. Barcelona finished second in La Liga. In early 2004, Barça announced it would not renew Cocu's contract. Both parties could not agree on a new deal after he did not accept Barcelona's significantly-lowered offer. Cocu was disappointed by the club's decision, but was happy to return to PSV, whose offer always remained. After his departure, he was awarded a plaque for his loyalty by club president Joan Laporta. Cocu's 205 La Liga matches and 291 total appearances were Barcelona records for a foreign player when he left; both records remained until Lionel Messi surpassed them in 2011 and 2012 respectively.

PSV and Al-Jazira
In 2004, Cocu signed a two-year contract with PSV. He formed a midfield with Johann Vogel and captain Mark van Bommel in a side that won the Eredivisie, the KNVB Cup and reached the Champions League semi-finals in the 2004–05 season. In the Champions League, Cocu scored the PSV away goal in the quarter-final match against Lyon (1–1). PSV reached the semi-finals, but were ultimately eliminated by Milan. After losing the away leg 2–0, PSV went 2–0 ahead in the return game with a goal by Cocu. A goal by Milan's Massimo Ambrosini, however, ended the hope to reach the finals, despite an injury-time second goal by Cocu. In the domestic league, Cocu missed the title-winning match against Vitesse after a sending-off in the previous match. He was handed his second yellow card against Willem II after being provoked by Martijn Reuser.

When Mark van Bommel left PSV in 2005, Cocu was handed the role of captain by manager Guus Hiddink. PSV won the league title again and reached the second round of the Champions League, where they were eliminated by Lyon. Cocu was sent off in the return match. For his league performances, Cocu won the Zilveren Schoen as the second-best Eredivisie player that year. After the 2005–06 season, Cocu signed a one-year contract extension with PSV. The team started the 2006–07 season well, but the performances heavily declined in the second half of the season and the title was almost lost. The championship was to be decided on the last league round, with PSV facing Vitesse. PSV won the match 5–1, with Cocu scoring the final goal. This goal eventually decided the title race: the goal difference between PSV and runners-up Ajax was one goal, just enough for the Eredivisie title win.

Cocu was close to announcing his retirement after the 2006–07 season, but still received offers from Australia and Al Jazira Club. After consulting Al Jazira's Abe Knoop and Lázsló Jámbor (who worked for Ajax), he chose to sign a one-year deal with the club from the United Arab Emirates in August 2007. In his first match, played against Al Wasl, he immediately scored in the team's 2–1 victory. With Al-Jazira, Cocu appeared in 17 league matches and scored four goals. After the season ended, Cocu considered staying for another year, but ultimately chose to return to the Netherlands in time for the professional football coach course. In July 2009, Cocu received a testimonial match from PSV at the Philips Stadion. An all-star team consisting of Luís Figo, Edgar Davids, Frank de Boer and many other former players competed against the PSV first team.

International career

Cocu was close to his international debut in 1994. Coach Dick Advocaat listed him on the 25-man provisional squad for the 1994 World Cup due to his performances at Vitesse, but he eventually did not make the team. His international debut came at age 25 in early 1996 in an exhibition match against Germany, handed to him by Guus Hiddink. Cocu scored his first international goal against the Republic of Ireland in June. Cocu was called up for Euro 1996 by Hiddink. He appeared as a substitute in two group stage matches and was included in the first team for the quarter-final defeat against France. Two years later, the Dutch team qualified for the 1998 World Cup, with Cocu having secured his place as a first-team member. He appeared in all World Cup matches, while scoring in the group stage matches against South Korea and Mexico. In the semi-final against Brazil, the match went to a penalty shoot-out. Cocu took the third Dutch penalty, but his attempt was saved by Cláudio Taffarel. The Netherlands eventually lost the shoot-out (4–2) and missed out on the final.

Cocu and the Netherlands were present at Euro 2000 after automatically qualifying as a host. The Dutch side, with Cocu in all fixtures, won all group matches and the quarter-final against Yugoslavia. Still, Cocu and the team were again eliminated after a penalty shoot-out in the semi-finals, this time against Italy. The Netherlands and Cocu failed to qualify for the 2002 World Cup in a qualification group with Portugal and the Republic of Ireland. In 2003, Cocu received his first international sending-off in a friendly match against Belgium. The Netherlands did well in the Euro 2004 qualifiers, with Cocu scoring twice (both in separate matches against Austria). During Euro 2004, Cocu was chosen as team captain and appeared in all matches. In the quarter-finals against Sweden, he missed a penalty in the shoot-out, but the Netherlands still managed to win. In the semi-finals, the team was eliminated by hosts Portugal. After Euro 2004, Cocu lost the captain role to Edgar Davids, a decision made by new manager Marco van Basten.

The Netherlands qualified for the 2006 World Cup, with Cocu scoring three times in the qualifying matches. Cocu was a first-team member in most games, but a sending-off against Andorra in September 2005 meant that Cocu missed the last two qualifiers. At the World Cup, the Netherlands progressed from the group stage, but were knocked out by Portugal in the second round, with Cocu coming close to equalizing by hitting the crossbar shortly after the start of the second half. After the tournament, Cocu retired from international football. With 101 caps for the Netherlands, Cocu is currently ranked fifth in the list of most Dutch international appearances. He was granted a farewell and a golden plaque for his services before the match against Belarus in September 2006. In 2011, Cocu was named bondsridder of the Royal Dutch Football Association (KNVB), an honorary title for his service to Dutch football.

Managerial career

PSV Eindhoven
After Cocu's return from the UAE in 2008, he showed interest in becoming a football coach. He joined the professional football coach course in order to achieve the necessary coaching badges and returned to PSV to assist in several youth squads. Cocu was also immediately appointed second assistant of Bert van Marwijk, who became manager of the Netherlands national team. Later, his role at PSV changed to assisting Ernest Faber at the PSV under-19 squad and becoming a trainee for the PSV first team under Huub Stevens in late 2008. After Stevens resigned in January 2009, Cocu became the assistant manager under caretaker manager Dwight Lodeweges. After the season finished, he continued to be part-time available for the first team. In February 2010, he passed his coaching exam, enabling him to be a manager in the Netherlands. A month later, Cocu agreed to remain assistant manager for the Dutch national team for another two years. With the Netherlands, he was present at the 2010 World Cup, where the team lost the final against Spain.

In December 2010, Cocu was promoted to first assistant manager at the Dutch national team after Frank de Boer became manager of Ajax. In the summer of 2011, Cocu signed a new two-year contract with PSV. When Fred Rutten was dismissed as PSV manager in March 2012, Cocu was appointed as caretaker manager for the remainder of the season. Faber joined PSV from FC Eindhoven to serve as Cocu's assistant. During his few months as manager, he promoted youngster Memphis Depay to the first team and replaced Andreas Isaksson with Przemysław Tytoń as the side's starting goalkeeper. The results did not improve, however, and after a 2–1 home defeat against RKC Waalwijk, Cocu vocally forfeited the title race. Despite winning the last five games in a row, Cocu and PSV finished third in the league, therefore missing out on Champions League football. Nonetheless, Cocu and the team won the KNVB Cup by beating Heracles Almelo 3–0 in the final.

For the 2012–13 season, the PSV board appointed Dick Advocaat as the new manager. Eager to gain more experience in coaching a team, Cocu took up the position of the PSV under-19 coach. He also gave up his job as assistant manager at the Dutch national team after Euro 2012, in which the Netherlands were eliminated in the first round. During the season, it was decided that Cocu would succeed Advocaat in case he would announce his departure. When Advocaat quit post-season, Cocu signed a four-year contract as manager of PSV. Joined by Faber and Chris van der Weerden as his assistants, Cocu stressed his emphasis on developing players from the PSV youth ranks. On 18 April 2015, Cocu won the Eredivisie title after a 4–1 win over Heerenveen. This was PSV's first league title since 2008, also ending a four-year domination of the league by Ajax. Cocu's team successfully defended the league title one season later.

Fenerbahçe
On 22 June 2018, Cocu was appointed on a three-year deal at Turkey's Fenerbahçe, who were under new ownership. He was dismissed on 28 October with the club just one point and one place above the relegation zone, following a 3–1 home loss to MKE Ankaragücü.

Derby County
On 5 July 2019, Cocu was announced as the new manager of Championship club Derby County. He guided Derby to a 10th-place finish, whilst installing a sense of total football locally known as Cocuball. On 14 November 2020, Cocu and Derby parted company with the club at the bottom of the league table.

Vitesse
Cocu returned to work after almost two years on 26 September 2022, being appointed at 14th-placed Vitesse, where he had left as a player in 1995. He replaced Thomas Letsch, who had left for VfL Bochum.

Career statistics

Club
Source:

International
Appearances and goals by national team and year

International goals
Scores and results list Netherlands' goal tally first.

Managerial statistics

Honours

Player
PSV
Eredivisie: 1996–97, 2004–05, 2005–06, 2006–07
KNVB Cup: 1995–96, 2004–05
Johan Cruyff Shield: 1996, 1997

Barcelona
La Liga: 1998–99

Al Jazira
Gulf Club Champions Cup: 2007

Manager
PSV
Eredivisie: 2014–15, 2015–16, 2017–18
KNVB Cup: 2011–12
Johan Cruyff Shield: 2015, 2016

Individual
Rinus Michels Award: 2015, 2018

See also
List of footballers with 100 or more caps

References

External links

1970 births
Living people
People from Zevenaar
Footballers from Eindhoven
Dutch footballers
Association football midfielders
AZ Alkmaar players
SBV Vitesse players
PSV Eindhoven players
FC Barcelona players
Al Jazira Club players
Eerste Divisie players
Eredivisie players
La Liga players
UAE Pro League players
Netherlands international footballers
UEFA Euro 1996 players
1998 FIFA World Cup players
UEFA Euro 2000 players
UEFA Euro 2004 players
2006 FIFA World Cup players
FIFA Century Club
Dutch expatriate footballers
Expatriate footballers in Spain
Expatriate footballers in the United Arab Emirates
Dutch expatriate sportspeople in Spain
Dutch expatriate sportspeople in the United Arab Emirates
Dutch football managers
PSV Eindhoven managers
Fenerbahçe football managers
Derby County F.C. managers
Eredivisie managers
Süper Lig managers
English Football League managers
Rinus Michels Award winners
Dutch expatriate football managers
Expatriate football managers in Turkey
Expatriate football managers in England
Dutch expatriate sportspeople in Turkey
Dutch expatriate sportspeople in England
De Graafschap players
Footballers from Gelderland